Franz Ferdinand is the debut studio album by Scottish indie rock band Franz Ferdinand, first released on 9 February 2004 through the Domino Recording Company. It was recorded during 2003 at Gula Studios in Malmö, Sweden, with Tore Johansson, who produced the majority of the album, with two tracks produced by the band themselves. It entered the United Kingdom album charts at number three in February 2004 and contains the UK top ten singles "Take Me Out" and "The Dark of the Matinée" as well as UK top 20 hit "Michael".

Franz Ferdinand won the 2004 Mercury Music Prize and was nominated for Best Alternative Album at the 47th Annual Grammy Awards.  The album has since sold over 3.6 million copies worldwide, with over 1.27 million copies in the United Kingdom and at least 1 million copies in the US (corresponding to Platinum).

Reception

Critical

Franz Ferdinand received universal critical acclaim, holding a score of 87 out of 100 on review aggregator site Metacritic, indicating "universal acclaim", based on 31 reviews. Simon Fernand of BBC Music wrote that Franz Ferdinand "may not be a particularly long album, but it is a masterpiece of funky, punky, suave cool from the first track to the last." Anthony Thornton of NME cited Franz Ferdinand as the latest act in a line of art school rock bands with "the absolute conviction that rock 'n' roll is more than a career option" and praised the album as "the latest and most intoxicating example of the wonderful pushing its way up between the ugly slabs of Pop Idol, nu metal and Britons aping American bands." Heather Phares of AllMusic said that Franz Ferdinand "ends up being rewarding in different ways than the band's previous work was, and it's apparent that they're one of the more exciting groups to come out of the garage rock/post-punk revival." Robert Christgau of The Village Voice gave the album a three-star honorable mention rating and quipped of the band: "Young enough to only work when they need the money, a musical tradition worth fighting for".

Franz Ferdinand is included in the book 1001 Albums You Must Hear Before You Die and was placed at number two on Planet Sound's Best Albums of 2004 list. Clash placed "Franz Ferdinand" at No.14 in its list of the top albums from 2004 to 2009. Online music magazine Pitchfork placed Franz Ferdinand at number 101 on their list of top 200 albums of the 2000s.

Commercial
Franz Ferdinand had a positive commercial performance. The album entered the UK album charts at number 3 in February 2004 and at number 12 on the Australian ARIA album charts in April 2004. The album entered the Billboard 200 album charts on 26 April 2004, and climbed slowly, peaking at number 32 in December 2004.

Track listing
All tracks are written by Alex Kapranos and Nick McCarthy, unless noted otherwise. All tracks are produced by Tore Johansson except "Tell Her Tonight" and "This Fire", produced by Franz Ferdinand.

Personnel
Credits adapted from the album's CD cover and liner notes.

Franz Ferdinand
Alex Kapranos – lead vocals, guitar
Nick McCarthy – guitar, keyboards, vocals
Bob Hardy – bass guitar, backing vocals
Paul Thomson – drums, percussion, backing vocals

Artwork
Vivian Lewis – back cover
Joe Dilworth – band photo
Roxanne Clifford – black and white photo
Martin Clark – label photo
Franz Ferdinand and Matthew Cooper – other artwork

Production
Tore Johansson – producer
Franz Ferdinand – producer 
Jens Lindgård – engineer
Stefan Kvarnström – engineer
Steve Rooke – mastering

Charts

Weekly charts

Year-end charts

Certifications

Release history

References

2004 debut albums
Franz Ferdinand (band) albums
Epic Records albums
Domino Recording Company albums
Mercury Prize-winning albums
Albums produced by Tore Johansson